Thakurganj is a town and a notified area, divided into 12 wards, in Kishanganj district in the Indian state of Bihar.

Geography
It has an average elevation of 82 metres (269 feet). It touches international border of  Nepal in one side and of West Bengal on other side.

Demographics
As of India 2011 census, Thakurganj had a population of 18,348. Males constitute 52.5% of the population and females 47.5%. In Thakurganj Nagar Panchayat, Female Sex Ratio is of 905 against state average of 918. Moreover, Child Sex Ratio in Thakurganj is around 937 compared to Bihar state average of 935. Thakurganj has an average literacy rate of 76.09%, higher than the state average of 61.80%: male literacy is 81.76%, and female literacy is 69.79%. In Thakurganj, 10.54% of the population is under 6 years of age.

References

See also

Cities and towns in Kishanganj district